Ken Williams may refer to:

Sports
Ken Williams (baseball) (1890–1959), baseball outfielder
Kenny Williams (baseball) (born April 6, 1964), outfielder and Executive Vice President of the Chicago White Sox
Ken Williams (basketball), American college basketball player
Ken Williams (Australian footballer) (1918–1977), Australian footballer for Collingwood
Kenneth Williams (New Zealand cricketer) (1882–1920), New Zealand cricketer
Kenneth Williams (Trinidadian cricketer) (born 1968), Trinidadian cricketer
Ken Williams (footballer, born 1927), English professional footballer
Kenneth Williams (swimmer) (born 1937), British Olympic swimmer

Other
Kenneth Williams (1926–1988), British actor
Ken Williams (composer) (born 1952), Canadian composer for film and television
Ken Williams (game developer) (born 1954), computer game developer and founder of Sierra On-Line
Ken Williams (songwriter) (1939–2022), American songwriter, music producer and singer
Kenneth L. Williams (born 1934), American herpetologist
Kenneth P. Williams (1887–1958), professor of mathematics at Indiana University
Kenneth Williams (politician) (1870–1935), Reform Party Member of Parliament in New Zealand
Kenneth T. Williams (born 1965), Cree playwright
Kenneth Williams (serial killer) (1979–2017), American serial killer executed in Arkansas

See also 
Kenny Williams (disambiguation)